Asylum Speakers is the debut album by the UK-based hip-hop group Foreign Beggars. It was released on 15 September 2003 on the group's own Dented Records label.

Track listing 

2003 debut albums
Dented Records albums
Foreign Beggars albums